Seydun-e Shomali Rural District is a rural district (dehestan) in Seydun District, Bagh-e Malek County, Khuzestan Province, Iran. At the 2006 census, its population was 7,078, in 1,284 families.  The rural district has 29 villages.

References 

Rural Districts of Khuzestan Province
Bagh-e Malek County